Shurin College of Foreign Languages is a language school in Tokyo, Japan. It offers courses for Japanese-Korean translation, Japanese-Chinese translation, and Business Japanese lessons. It is founded in 1988. It also owns a Japanese language school for foreign students.

References

Universities and colleges in Tokyo